Jethro Mashart (born 8 May 2000) is a Dutch professional footballer who plays as a left back for Eerste Divisie club NAC Breda.

Club career
Mashart made his Eredivisie debut for NAC Breda on 24 November 2018 in a game against Ajax.

Personal life
Mashart was born in the Netherlands and is of Surinamese descent.

References

External links
 

Living people
2000 births
Footballers from Rotterdam
Association football defenders
Dutch footballers
Dutch sportspeople of Surinamese descent
NAC Breda players
Eredivisie players